Omari Cobb (born May 31, 1997) is an American football linebacker who is a free agent. After playing college football for Marshall, he signed with the Chiefs as an undrafted free agent in 2020.

College career
Cobb played college football at Marshall from 2016 to 2019.

Professional career

Kansas City Chiefs 
Cobb signed with the Kansas City Chiefs as an undrafted free agent following the 2020 NFL Draft in April 2020. He was waived during final roster cuts on September 5, 2020, and signed to the team's practice squad the next day. He was elevated to the active roster on December 26 for the team's Week 16 game against the Atlanta Falcons, and reverted to the practice squad after the game.

On February 9, 2021, Cobb re-signed with the Chiefs. He was waived on August 31, 2021, and re-signed to the practice squad the next day. He was released on September 14.

New York Giants 
On September 29, 2021, Cobb was signed to the New York Giants practice squad. He signed a reserve/futures contract with the Giants on January 10, 2022. He was waived on May 10, 2022.

San Antonio Brahmas 
On November 17, 2022, Cobb was drafted by the San Antonio Brahmas of the XFL.

References

External links
Kansas City Chiefs bio
Marshall Thundering Herd bio

1997 births
Living people
American football linebackers
People from Port St. Lucie, Florida
Players of American football from Florida
Marshall Thundering Herd football players
Kansas City Chiefs players
New York Giants players